The Yorkshire Evening Post is a daily evening publication (delivered to newsagents every morning) published by Yorkshire Post Newspapers in Leeds, West Yorkshire, England.  The paper provides a regional slant on the day's news, and traditionally provides close reporting on Leeds United and Leeds Rhinos as well as the Yorkshire County Cricket Club team.

The newspaper generally takes a liberal/centre left position. Despite its title that implies the paper is Yorkshire wide it is a Leeds-based paper, still widely circulated in Bradford, Harrogate, Huddersfield and Wakefield as well.

The City of Leeds has two further widely circulated local papers, being the Wetherby News and the Wharfedale and Airedale Observer.

For many years, the Evening Post produced a separate edition for South Yorkshire printed simultaneously in Doncaster. In 1970 that was converted into the now-closed Doncaster Evening Post.

Starting in 1926, the Yorkshire Evening Post sponsored motorcycle trial events on Post Hill, an area near Farnley specifically acquired for this purpose.

Move from Leeds
In February 2012 Johnston Press announced that printing of The Yorkshire Post and Yorkshire Evening Post in Leeds would be switched to their plant at Dinnington near Sheffield and the Wellington Street printing facility closed.

In September 2013, it was announced the Wellington Street premises would be demolished as journalists had already moved out.  Preliminary demolition began in March 2014; April 2014 it was announced the tower would be spared.

Memoir

In his 2015 memoir, former reporter Revel Barker recalled the 1960s: 

"During the cricket season...the Evening Post would be on the streets at 10.30 a.m. The 'First' would be out about noon, the 'Final' at 2 p.m., the 'One-star final' around 3.30 and the 'Late Night Final' about 4.30. the Post was selling around 250,000 copies a night... nowadays there is only one edition, written and produced the night before and printed in Sheffield, 36 miles away"

(In 1963) "our main competition the Yorkshire Evening News succumbed to economic pressures and folded to merge with the YEP – for a brief time creating a daily circulation close to half a million copies."

Availability

The Yorkshire Evening Post is widely available across the City of Leeds as well as areas around Harrogate, Wakefield, Dewsbury and Ilkley.  An online edition is also available.

References

External links

YEP Community Websites
Digitised copies of the Yorkshire Evening Post, 1890-1904 at the British Newspaper Archive

1890 establishments in England
Mass media in Leeds
Newspapers published in Yorkshire
Newspapers established in 1890
Daily newspapers published in the United Kingdom
Newspapers published by Johnston Press
Yorkshire Post Newspapers